Eriogonum prociduum is a species of wild buckwheat known by the common name prostrate buckwheat. It is native to the western Great Basin of the United States in the region where Oregon meets California and Nevada, especially the Modoc Plateau, where it grows in exposed volcanic soils. It is a perennial herb growing a clump or mat of small woolly oval leaves around a branching woody caudex. The inflorescence arises on a scape and bears a rounded cluster of bright yellow flowers.

External links
Jepson Manual Treatment
Photo gallery

prociduum
Flora of California
Flora of Nevada
Flora of Oregon
Flora of the Great Basin
~
Endemic flora of the United States
Flora without expected TNC conservation status